The As Is Now EP is a limited edition single by Paul Weller released in 2006. The EP was released to coincide with his 2006 Brit Award for Outstanding Contribution to Music.

Track listing
The track listing of the EP consisted of Blink and You'll Miss It, a track from his latest studio album at the time As Is Now, and the three other single from the same album

Blink & You'll Miss It
From The Floorboards Up
Here's The Good News
Come On / Let's Go

External links
Amazon

References

2006 EPs
Paul Weller EPs
V2 Records EPs